Antilocapra pacifica, also known as the Pacific pronghorn, is an extinct antilocaprid from the Late Pleistocene of California.

Description
The Pacific pronghorn was described in 1991 from material found near the San Joaquin River delta near Antioch, California.
While closely related to the living pronghorn, it is distinguished by aspects of horn core, orbit and temporal-fossa morphology. The Pacific pronghorn was also slightly larger than its living relative.

References

Pleistocene even-toed ungulates
Pronghorns
Pleistocene mammals of North America
Pleistocene extinctions